Ernesto Bernardo "Tito" Cucchiaroni (16 November 1927 – 4 July 1971) was an Argentine football player, born in Posadas, Argentina, who last played as a left winger for Italian club Sampdoria. During his time in Italy, he won the 1956–57 Serie A title with A.C. Milan. At international level, he won the 1955 South American Championship with the Argentina national football team.

Club career
Cucchiaroni was born in the Argentine city of Posadas. He started his playing career with Rivadavia de Lincoln before leaving at the age of 22 to join Club Atlético Tigre.

After spending five years at Tigre, Cucchiaroni moved to Boca Juniors where he spent a further two years playing under Jaime Sarlanga, and Mario Fortunato in 1955 and 1956 respectively.

It wasn't long before Cucchiaroni caught the eyes of overseas interest and in 1956, he was picked up by Italian giants A.C. Milan. His first season for Milan was fairly productive, doing 27 league appearances and 4 goals whilst also playing a further 5 games (scoring once) in the European Champion Clubs' Cup. Cucchiaroni's second season however was not so productive only appearing 13 times and scoring twice.

In June, 1958 Cucchiaroni transferred from Milan to Real Jaén. Cucchiaroni remained at Real Jaén from 1958 to 1959 before finally settling down at Sampdoria where he spent the remainder of his career. He retired in June 1963 after accumulating 138 league appearances and 40 goals.

International career
In 1956, Cucchiaroni was selected for Argentina in the South American Championship. Argentina went on to the final where they beat Chile 1–0. All up, Cucchiaroni made 11 appearances for the Argentina without scoring.

Honours

Club
A.C. Milan
 Serie A Winner (1): 1956–57

International
Argentina
 South American Championship (Copa América) Winner (1): 1955

References

1927 births
1971 deaths
Argentine footballers
Argentina international footballers
Association football wingers
Club Atlético Tigre footballers
Boca Juniors footballers
A.C. Milan players
Real Jaén footballers
U.C. Sampdoria players
Club Atlético Huracán managers
Argentine football managers
People from Posadas, Misiones
Sportspeople from Misiones Province